NTEN: The Nonprofit Technology Enterprise Network is an international nonprofit organization based in the United States.  Founded in 2000, NTEN is primarily a community for those interested in the use of technology to support nonprofit organizations and issues.  Its major activity is an annual international conference,  the Nonprofit Technology Conference, for nonprofit organizations, IT staff, consultants, and technology vendors. It also hosts various virtual and regional events throughout the year.

Overview 

NTEN is the trade association for nonprofit technology assistance providers. Described in the Nonprofit Quarterly as "One of the more recent and potentially powerful networks evolving in the nonprofit technology-assistance scene",  the association provides forums for people involved in nonprofit technology, acts as a conduit for connecting journalists and researchers with nonprofit technology practitioners, makes technology information and resources available to organizations and undertakes research for the sector. It runs the annual Nonprofit Technology Conference (NTC) in the USA as well as co-hosting other events, including the first Circuit Rider Conference in the UK.

See also

Nonprofit technology
Circuit rider (Technology)
NTAP
Community of practice

References

External links
 

Non-profit technology
Non-profit organizations based in Oregon
Organizations established in 2000
2000 establishments in Oregon